Crossosoma is a genus of millipedes in the family Craspedosomatidae. There are about 10 described species in Crossosoma.

Species
 Crossosoma broelemanni Strasser, 1975
 Crossosoma casalei Strasser, 1979
 Crossosoma cavernicola (Manfredi, 1951)
 Crossosoma falciferum Strasser, 1975
 Crossosoma fossum Strasser, 1979
 Crossosoma mauriesi Strasser, 1970
 Crossosoma parvum Strasser, 1979
 Crossosoma peyerimhoffi (Brölemann, 1902)
 Crossosoma phantasma Strasser, 1970
 Crossosoma semipes (Strasser, 1958)

References

Further reading

 
 
 
 

Chordeumatida
Millipede genera